Sigu (Sighu) is an undocumented threatened Bantu language spoken in Gabon.

References

Kele languages